Hugues de Revel (died 1277 in the Holy Land) was an English knight who became the twentieth Grand Master of the Knights Hospitaller, serving from 1258 to 1277 as the successor to Guillaume de Chateauneuf. He was succeeded by Nicolas Lorgne.

Origins
Born before 1222, by some accounts he was a son of Richard Reynell, a Somerset squire whose father was Richard Reynell (died before 1213), Sheriff of Devon in 1191–4. This attribution is cast in doubt by recent research which suggests that the younger Richard's only heir was a daughter Sabina.

Administration of the Order 
Hugues de Revel was Châtelain of the Krak des Chevaliers from 1243–1248 and Grand Commander of the Order from 1251–1258. In the latter position, he succeeded Jean de Ronay.

Upon the death of Guillaume de Chateauneuf in 1258, Hugues de Revel was elected Grand Master of the Order. His first act was dated 9 October 1258. As soon as he was elected, he had to face the consequences of the War of Saint Sabas. Bohemond VI of Antioch, wanting to take revenge on the Embriaco lords of Gibelet, attacked them and found his allies, the Templars and his opponents William II of Botron and the Hospitallers. The death of Bertrand Embriaco, son of Hugues de Gibelet, put an end to the conflict but the Templars with the brothers of Saint-Lazare and Saint-Thomas attacked the Hospitallers, but this ended in a resounding victory of the Hospitallers and the almost complete massacre of the Templars. The Templars and the Hospitallers were able to overcome their differences in 1262, mainly with the extinction of the claims of Margat and Sidon.

Revel strengthened the Hospitaller domain by acquiring the Benedictine abbey on Mount Tabor,  but the consent of the Archbishop of Nazareth was not obtained until 1263. He had direct relations with the Mamluk Sultan Baibars in 1263, 1266 and 1267–1268. The siege of the Templar fortress of Safied by the Mamluk army led the Hospitallers to negotiate a separate truce for the Krak des Chevaliers and the fortress of Margat in 1267, but Baybars' armies seized the Krak in 1271, which did not prevent Revel from negotiating a truce the same year.

Hugues de Revel attached his name to the modification of the statutes of the Order during the general chapters of 1268, 1270, 1274 and 1276 as the compilations of sentences, the "esgarts", and customs, the "usances", fixed between 1239 and 1271 were most certainly made at the instigation of Revel. The success of the administrative activity of Revel is largely due to the treasurer Joseph de Chauncy who officiated from 1248 to 1271 before being called by Edward I of England.

Hugues de Revel died between the second half of 1277 and the first half of 1278. His successor Nicolas Lorgne exercised his magisterium on 16 June 1278.

Epigraphy from de Revel's magistracy
Jean de Valenciennes was twice delegated by Louis IX of France to obtained the release of a large number of prisoners of the Seventh Crusade's Battle of Fariskur, including de Revel's predecessor Guillaume de Chateauneuf. Previous assertions that he was either a Frankish knight or a lord of Haifa who died in 1270 have been shown to be incorrect. Instead, he has been identified as a canon who lived in Acre. His grave is mystifying as the epitaph remains unfinished and is not preceded by a cross.  There are proposed explanations that have been offered. Lack of funds could have caused the stonecutter to leave the engraving unfinished. Or the executors decided to return the corpse to the County of Hainaut for final burial, leaving the incomplete epitaph.

See also
 Cartulaire général de l'Ordre des Hospitaliers
 List of Knights Hospitaller sites
 Langue (Knights Hospitaller)
 Flags of the Knights Hospitaller

References

Bibliography

External links
Hugues Revel. French Wikipedia.
Liste des grands maîtres de l'ordre de Saint-Jean de Jérusalem. French Wikipedia.
Eugène Harot, Essai d’armorial des Grands-Maîtres de l’Ordre de Saint Jean de Jérusalem.
Seals of the Grand Masters. Museum of the Order of St John.
Charles Moeller, Hospitallers of St. John of Jerusalem. Catholic Encyclopedia (1910). 7. New York: Robert Appleton Company.
Knights of the Order of the Hospital of St John of Jerusalem, Encyclopædia Britannica. 24. (11th ed.). Cambridge University Press. pp. 12–19.

Knights Hospitaller
Grand Masters of the Knights Hospitaller
Reynell family